Semyonov is the name of several inhabited localities in Russia.

Urban localities
Semyonov, Nizhny Novgorod Oblast, a town in Nizhny Novgorod Oblast

Rural localities
Semyonov, Krasnodar Krai, a khutor in Bratsky Rural Okrug of Ust-Labinsky District of Krasnodar Krai
Semyonov, Koverninsky District, Nizhny Novgorod Oblast, a pochinok in Bolshemostovsky Selsoviet of Koverninsky District of Nizhny Novgorod Oblast
Semyonov, Volgograd Oblast, a khutor in Tormosinovsky Selsoviet of Chernyshkovsky District of Volgograd Oblast
Semyonov, Voronezh Oblast, a khutor in Skupopotudanskoye Rural Settlement of Nizhnedevitsky District of Voronezh Oblast